Milnthorpe is a small market town on the southern border of Cumbria, 7 miles south of Kendal, civil parish and electoral ward are in the South Lakeland district of Cumbria, England. Historically in the county of Westmorland and on the A6, the town contains several old hostelries and hosts a market every Friday. The parish, which includes the small village of Ackenthwaite, had a population of 2,199 according to the 2011 Census.

History
Milnthorpe is the site of the 19th-century Church of St Thomas, which overlooks Overlooking The Green and The Square designed by Kendal architect George Webster. Prior to its construction Milnthorpe was in the parish of Heversham.

Milnthorpe became a centre of business and activity because it was originally a port, using the River Bela and estuary (now only navigable to Arnside), and it remains a significant commercial centre for the area.

Tourism and hospitality have always thrived, Milnthorpe being a convenient stop-off point on the A6 for coaches and cars en route to the Lake District. Just to the north is Levens Hall, famed for its topiary. The village used to be a major traffic bottleneck before the opening of the M6 motorway in 1970, and the A590/A591 Kendal link road a few years later. The nearby Dallam deer park, part of the wider Dallam Tower Estate, is a popular spot for pedestrian, particularly those en route to the Arnside and Silverdale AONB.

The popular children's drink Um Bongo was made in Milnthorpe by Libby's in the 1980s. Milnthorpe is the home of Duralon Combs, a comb manufacturing business over 300 years old. Also Bigfish Internet Ltd, the UKs earliest Internet Design and Hosting Company. Now located in larger offices 2 miles away in Sandside.

Community
Each August, the Friends of the Exhibition holds its annual art exhibition in the church. Milnthorpe has two steel bands, one for adults and the other for the town's junior school.

The Grade I listed house Dallam Tower, with an estate known for its deer, stands near to the River Bela just south-west of Milnthorpe, whilst St Anthony's Tower may be seen on the top of St Anthony's Hill to the north-east of the town centre, overlooking the village and the housing estate of Owlet Ash Fields in nearby Ackenthwaite.

It has one secondary school, Dallam School, and one primary school, Milnthorpe Primary School.

There are three public houses in the village.

People
The former Leader of the Liberal Democrats (2015–17), Tim Farron (MP for Westmorland and Lonsdale) lives in Milnthorpe.

John Taylor, third president of the Church of Jesus Christ of Latter-day Saints from 1880–87, was born in Milnthorpe and lived there, until he immigrated to Canada.

Gallery

See also

Listed buildings in Milnthorpe

References

External links

 Cumbria County History Trust: Milnthorpe (nb: provisional research only - see Talk page)
  Cumbria County History Trust: Heversham (nb: provisional research only - see Talk page)
  Milnthorpe in Cumbria Directory
Milnthorpe & Heversham
 Levens Hall

 
Villages in Cumbria
Market towns in Cumbria
Westmorland
Civil parishes in Cumbria
South Lakeland District